Banaf (also Romanized as Banāf; also known as Banāv) is a village in Kamaraj Rural District, Kamaraj and Konartakhteh District, Kazerun County, Fars Province, Iran. At the 2006 census, its population was 795, in 179 families.

References 

Populated places in Kazerun County